A list of films produced in Italy in 1935 (see 1935 in film):

See also
List of Italian films of 1934
List of Italian films of 1936

References

External links
Italian films of 1935 at the Internet Movie Database

Italian
1935
Films